Clare Island Abbey, officially St. Brigid's Abbey, is a former Cistercian monastery and National Monument located in Clare Island, Ireland.

Location

Clare Island Abbey is located in the centre of the south part of Clare Island, near the post office.

History

Saint Bridget`s Abbey was founded in the 12th/13th century and in 1224 became a cell of Knockmoy Abbey, a Cistercian abbey near Tuam.

It was rebuilt . It contains numerous tombs of the local ruling family, the Ó Máille (O'Malley) and tradition claims it as the site of the baptism, marriages and burial of Gráinne "Grace" O'Malley (c. 1530 – c. 1603), the famous "pirate queen." She is believed to have been interred at the O'Malley tomb which has a canopy.

The abbey was probably dissolved during the late 16th century. Later it was a place of refuge for Carmelite Friars.

Building

The abbey is furnished with piscina, sedilia, carved heads and ogee and cusp-headed lancet windows.

Clare Island Abbey contains a series of medieval wall and ceiling paintings. They depict mythical, human and animal figures including dragons, a cockerel, stags, men on foot and on horseback, a harper, birds and trees. Such ornamentation is unusual for a Cistercian foundation.

References

Cistercian monasteries in the Republic of Ireland
Religion in County Mayo
Archaeological sites in County Mayo
National Monuments in County Mayo